is a Japanese singer who is best known for her vocals in the opening songs of the anime version of Fate/stay night. She has a 3½-octave vocal range.

Although her name was written in katakana, her birth name is written in kanji. However, as of December 2010, she chose to write her first name in Kanji.

Discography

Singles

Albums

Cover albums

DVDs 
  – Ranked No. 93
  – Ranked No. 151

Notes 
 Sachi admitted that Aitai yo is actually a song that she wrote to express her feelings when she had to leave the person she loved during the summer of 2006. She also admits that her lyrics was soaked with tears by the time she was finished writing them, and that the greatest thing about singers is that they can express their true feelings honestly through melody and voice.

References

External links 
 Official Site 
 Blog 
 Oricon Profile 
 
 
 Official Shop  

1986 births
Living people
People from Kakogawa, Hyōgo
Japanese women singer-songwriters
Japanese singer-songwriters
Musicians from Hyōgo Prefecture
NBCUniversal Entertainment Japan artists
Anime musicians
21st-century Japanese singers
21st-century Japanese women singers